Lieutenant General Martín Antonio Balza (13 June 1934 Salto, Buenos Aires) is an Argentine military former Chief of Staff of the Argentine Army. From 2003 to 2011 he was  Argentine ambassador to the Republic of Colombia.

A man of strong democratic convictions, he stood up for the legitimate government in every attempted coup d'état throughout his senior career. He also gave the first institutional self-criticism about the Armed Forces' involvement in the 1976 coup and the ensuing reign of terror.

Career 

Balza is an artillery officer specialised in mountain warfare.

In 1982, with the rank of Lt Colonel he participated in the Falklands War as commander of the 3rd Artillery Group. He was awarded the Argentine Army to the Military Merit Medal for his conduct during this campaign.  

In 1991 he became Chief of Staff of the Argentine Army during the presidencies of Carlos Menem and Fernando De la Rua.  During this period Human Rights Watch mentions the following incident:

In 2003 he caused a stir as he declared his conviction that in 1978 Chile would have won the war during the Beagle conflict.

In 2009, his superior in the Falklands War, Mario Menéndez claimed that oft-quoted figure of 30,000 disappeared people during the 1976-1983 Argentine military dictatorship was "invented number" and lambasted him for supporting the 30,000 figure. Menendez also criticized Balza for not owning up to his role in the Dirty war and for portraying Argentine officers in his book Malvinas: Gesta e Incompetencia (Editorial Atlántida, 2003) as "idiots or pusillanimous."

On 5 April 2011 he came under severe criticism from Fundación Víctimas Visibles and Colombian army general Julio Eduardo Echarry Solano for denying the Marxist ERP and Peronist Montoneros guerrilla groups still remained a menace in the months previous to the coup in Argentina and for stating that Argentine victims of left-wing guerrilla groups in Argentina had no recourse to justice for their time to do so with the Statute of Limitations had expired.

Decorations and badges

 Legion of Honor
 Argentine Army to the Military Merit Medal
 United Nations Medal

References 

 Balza, Martin (2001). Dejo Constancia, Editorial Planeta.  

Argentine generals
Argentine diplomats
Living people
1934 births
Argentine military personnel of the Falklands War
Argentine prisoners of war
Commanders of the Legion of Merit
Ambassadors of Argentina to Colombia
Ambassadors of Argentina to Costa Rica
People from Salto Partido
Recipients of the Medal of Military Merit (Uruguay)
Recipients of the Order of Military Merit (Brazil)